Johan Ramon Quezada (born August 25, 1994) is a Dominican professional baseball pitcher in the Miami Marlins organization. He made his Major League Baseball (MLB) debut in 2020 for the Marlins.

Career

Minnesota Twins
On September 10, 2012, Quezada signed a minor league contract with the Minnesota Twins. He would spend the next 7 seasons in the Twins minor league system, playing for the DSL Twins in 2013 and 2014, the GCL Twins in 2015, the Elizabethton Twins in 2016-2018, the Single-A Cedar Rapids Kernels in 2018, and the advanced Single-A Fort Myers Miracle in 2019. He elected free agency on November 4, 2019.

Miami Marlins
On December 18, 2019, Quezada signed a minor league contract with the Miami Marlins organization. The Marlins promoted him to the major leagues on September 11, 2020. He made his major league debut on September 12 against the Philadelphia Phillies.

St. Louis Cardinals
The Philadelphia Phillies claimed Quezada off of waivers on October 30, 2020.

On February 10, 2021, the St. Louis Cardinals acquired Quezada from the Phillies in exchange for cash considerations. Quezada spent the entire 2021 season split between three minor league affiliates: the rookie-level Florida Complex League Cardinals, the Double-A Springfield Cardinals, and the Triple-A Memphis Redbirds. In 18 total appearances between the three clubs, Quezada struggled to a 6.38 ERA with 28 strikeouts in 24.0 innings pitched. 

On March 29, 2022, Quezada was designated for assignment by the Cardinals following the signing of Albert Pujols. On March 30, Quezada was sent outright to Double-A Springfield. He made 44 appearances in the Cardinals’ farm system in 2022, posting a 2-1 record and 4.83 ERA with 73 strikeouts in 59.2 innings pitched. He elected free agency on November 10, 2022.

Miami Marlins (second stint)
On February 3, 2023, Quezada signed a minor league contract with the Miami Marlins organization.

References

External links

Living people
1994 births
Sportspeople from Santo Domingo
Major League Baseball players from the Dominican Republic
Major League Baseball pitchers
Miami Marlins players
Dominican Summer League Twins players
Gulf Coast Twins players
Elizabethton Twins players
Cedar Rapids Kernels players
Fort Myers Miracle players
Toros del Este players